The 1972 Soviet Cup was an association football cup competition of the Soviet Union. The winner of the competition, Torpedo Moscow qualified for the continental tournament.

Competition schedule

Preliminary round
 [Feb 21, 25] 
 ALGA Frunze                1-0  1-0  Stroitel Ashkhabad 
 Krivbass Krivoi Rog        1-2  1-3  AVTOMOBILIST Nalchik 
 PAMIR Dushanbe             2-1  1-0  Nistru Kishinev 
 SHINNIK Yaroslavl          4-1  0-0  Zvezda Perm

First round
 [Feb 26, Mar 5] 
 TORPEDO Moskva             2-1  1-0  Torpedo Kutaisi         [both legs in Sochi] 
   [1. Viktor Filippov, Vadim Nikonov – Shota Okropirashvili. Att: 4,000] 
   [2. Yuriy Smirnov 20. Att: 6,000] 
 [Feb 28, Mar 3] 
 DINAMO Moskva              3-1  0-0  Shakhtyor Donetsk 
   [1. Anatoliy Kozhemyakin 25, Andrei Yakubik 60, Anatoliy Baidachny 79 – Yuriy Gubich 88. Att: 8,000 (in Sochi)] 
   [2. Att: 20,000] 
 [Feb 28, Mar 4] 
 Dinamo Minsk               1-1  0-1  SHAKHTYOR Karaganda 
   [1. Eduard Malofeyev 85 pen – Anatoliy Novikov 65. Att: 8,000 (in Sukhumi)] 
   [2. Anatoliy Novikov 36. Att: 20,000] 
 [Feb 29, Mar 4] 
 KARPATY Lvov               1-0  3-1  Pamir Dushanbe 
   [1. Eduard Kozinkevich 78. Att: 30,000] 
   [2. ? - Rudik Yegiazaryan] 
 Neftchi Baku               1-0  0-3  METALLURG Zaporozhye 
 Shinnik Yaroslavl          0-1  w/o  KAYRAT Alma-Ata 
   [1. Nikolai Osyanin 64] 
 SKA Rostov-na-Donu         0-0  1-0  Avtomobilist Nalchik 
   [1. (in Adler)] 
   [2. Viktor Churkin 15] 
 SPARTAK Moskva             5-1  0-0  UralMash Sverdlovsk     [both legs in Sochi] 
   [1. Viktor Papayev 6, Gennadiy Logofet 11, ?, Vladimir Redin ?, Vyacheslav Yegorovich 67 – Alexandr Zhuravlyov ?. Att: 5,000] 
   [2. Att: 3,000] 
 Zarya Voroshilovgrad       0-0  0-0  CHERNOMORETS Odessa     [pen 3-5] 
   [1. Att: 5,000 (in Sukhumi)] 
   [2. Att: 15,000] 
 [Mar 1, 5] 
 Ararat Yerevan             0-2  1-0  DINAMO Leningrad 
 DINAMO Kiev                2-1  1-1  Textilshchik Ivanovo    [both legs in Sochi]
   [1. Vitaliy Shevchenko 62, Vladimir Veremeyev 87 pen – Mikhail Potapov 86. Att: 3,000] 
   [2. Vitaliy Shevchenko 42 – Stanislav Lyubavin 22 pen. Att: 4,500] 
 [Mar 1, 7] 
 Alga Frunze                0-1  0-4  ZENIT Leningrad 
   [1. Georgiy Vyun 33. Att: 2,000 (in Hosta)] 
   [2. Georgiy Khromchenkov 6, Mikhail Fokin 34, Boris Kokh 38, Vyacheslav Bulavin 55. Att: 100 (in Sochi)] 
 [Mar 2, 6] 
 CSKA Moskva                1-0  1-1  Avtomobilist Orjonikidze 
   [1. Vladimir Dudarenko 35. (in Sochi)] 
   [2. Vladimir Polikarpov – Vladimir Titov] 
 DNEPR Dnepropetrovsk       2-1  2-3  Pahtakor Tashkent 
   [1. Viktor Romanyuk-2 – Berador Abduraimov] 
   [2. Viktor Nazarov, ? (P) og - Berador Abduraimov, Tulyagan Isakov, Bohadyr Ibragimov] 
 [Mar 4, 8] 
 Metallist Kharkov          2-0  1-4  DINAMO Tbilisi 
   [1. Anatoliy Ignatenko 77, Zorbeg Ebralidze (D) 81 og] 
   [2. Levan Nodia 3, 44, 71 pen, Georgiy Gavasheli 89 – Vladimir Chaplygin 9] 
 [Mar 4, 12] 
 LOKOMOTIV Moskva           1-1  3-0  Krylya Sovetov Kuibyshev 
   [1. Yuriy Chesnokov 57 – Ravil Aryapov 90. Att: 1,500 (in Hosta)] 
   [2. Nikolai Zudin ?, Yuriy Chesnokov ?, Nikolai Timofeyev 89. (in Sochi)]

Second round
 [Mar 11, 15] 
 ZENIT Leningrad            2-0  2-0  Dinamo Leningrad 
   [1. Boris Kokh 22, Pavel Sadyrin 44 pen. Att: 2,000 (in Sochi)] 
   [2. Pavel Sadyrin 63 pen, Vladimir Ivanov 83. Att: 1,000 (in Gagra)] 
 [Mar 11, 16] 
 SPARTAK Moskva             1-0  1-2  Metallurg Zaporozhye 
   [1. Galimzyan Husainov 48. Att: 5,000 (in Sochi)] 
   [2. Nikolai Kiselyov 80 – Oleg Novikov 5, Viktor Kutin 55. Att: 20,000] 
 [Mar 12, 15] 
 TORPEDO Moskva             2-0  1-0  Dnepr Dnepropetrovsk 
   [1. Alexandr Grebnev 5, Yuriy Smirnov 44. Att: 5,000 (in Sochi)] 
   [2. Yuriy Smirnov 3. Att: 30,000] 
 [Mar 12, 16] 
 Chernomorets Odessa        1-0  0-3  KARPATY Lvov 
   [1. Sergei Zvenigorodskiy 86. Att: 10,000] 
   [2. Roman Khizhak 47, Bogdan Greshchak 56, Eduard Kozinkevich 64. Att: 32,000] 
 Dinamo Kiev                1-0  0-1  SKA Rostov-na-Donu      [pen 8-9] 
   [1. Vladimir Muntyan 30 pen. Att: 15,000 (in Simferopol)] 
   [2. Anzor Chikhladze 30. Att: 26,000] 
 DINAMO Tbilisi             3-0  0-0  Shakhtyor Karaganda 
   [1. Givi Nodia 9, 31, 65] 
   [2. Att: 10,000] 
 [Mar 13, 17] 
 CSKA Moskva                1-0  0-0  Dinamo Moskva 
   [1. Vladimir Zhigunov 88. Att: 5,500 (in Sochi)] 
   [2. Att: 25,000 (in Tashkent)] 
 [Mar 15, 18] 
 Kayrat Alma-Ata            1-1  1-2  LOKOMOTIV Moskva 
   [1. Nikolai Osyanin 16 – Nikolai Timofeyev 13. Att: 2,000 (in Sochi)] 
   [2. Vladislav Markin 88 – Viktor Davydov 17, Valentin Spiridonov 84. Att: 1,800 (in Hosta)]

Quarterfinals
 [Mar 21, 25] 
 KARPATY Lvov               0-0  1-1  Dinamo Tbilisi 
   [1. Att: 32,000] 
   [2. Lev Brovarskiy 66 – Givi Nodia 50. Att: 50,000] 
 SKA Rostov-na-Donu         1-1  0-3  CSKA Moskva 
   [1. Viktor Churkin 36 – Vladimir Dorofeyev 58. Att: 30,000] 
   [2. Boris Kopeikin 5, 29, 58. Att: 7,000 (in Sochi)] 
 TORPEDO Moskva             0-0  2-0  Zenit Leningrad         [both legs in Sochi]
   [1. Att: 5,000] 
   [2. Yuriy Smirnov 36, 80. Att: 7,000] 
 [Mar 22, 25] 
 SPARTAK Moskva             2-1  2-1  Lokomotiv Moskva 
   [1. Viktor Papayev 70, Vasiliy Kalinov 87 – Nikolai Zudin 52. Att: 4,000 (in Sochi)] 
   [2. Vyacheslav Yegorovich 40, 53 – Anatoliy Kozlov 8. Att: 1,500 (in Hosta)]

Semifinals
 [Jul 2, 28] 
 SPARTAK Moskva             2-0  2-0  Karpaty Lvov 
   [1. Alexandr Piskaryov 40, Galimzyan Husainov 50. Att: 55,000] 
   [2. Mikhail Bulgakov 41, Valeriy Andreyev 56. Att: 25,000] 
 TORPEDO Moskva             0-0  4-1  CSKA Moskva 
   [2. Anatoliy Degtyaryov 16, 22, 44, Anatoliy Fetisov ? – Vladimir Polikarpov 31]

Final

External links
 Complete calendar. helmsoccer.narod.ru
 1972 Soviet Cup. Footballfacts.ru
 1972 Soviet football season. RSSSF

Soviet Cup seasons
Cup
Soviet Cup
Soviet Cup